Milford is an unincorporated community in Caroline County, in the U.S. state of Virginia.  It was a stop on the Richmond, Fredericksburg and Potomac Railroad in the nineteenth century; the railroad has since been replaced by CSXT.

Milford is west of Bowling Green along VA 207, and is home to Caroline Middle School and High School.

References

Unincorporated communities in Virginia
Unincorporated communities in Caroline County, Virginia